Ivan Russell (born 13 October 1952) is a former Australian rules footballer who played for Geelong in the Victorian Football League (now known as the Australian Football League).

Russell was best on ground in Beechworth’s losing 1969 Ovens & King Football League grand final side before signing with Geelong.

Russell later played 87 games with Geelong West Football Club, between 1975 and 1979, including their 1975 VFA Division One premiership.

Russell represented the VFA in 1979, in a convincing 156 point win against Queensland at Toorak Park.

Son of former Richmond and Geelong footballer, Wally Russell.

References

External links
 
 
 1975 VFA Division One Premiers: Geelong West FC team photo

1952 births
Living people
Geelong Football Club players
Australian rules footballers from Victoria (Australia)